Henry Norrström (28 January 1918 – 14 May 1996) was a Swedish long-distance runner. He competed in the marathon at the 1952 Summer Olympics.

References

External links
 

1918 births
1996 deaths
Athletes (track and field) at the 1952 Summer Olympics
Swedish male long-distance runners
Swedish male marathon runners
Olympic athletes of Sweden
People from Gävle
Sportspeople from Gävleborg County